Desolation Island is the fifth historical novel in  the Aubrey-Maturin series by Patrick O'Brian. It was first published in 1978.

Jack Aubrey is in funds from his successful mission to take the islands of Mauritius and Reunion. His house has additions, but he is ready for another voyage. The story includes a voyage meant to reach Australia, and occurs prior to the War of 1812.

Critics have praised the novel's “literate, clear-eyed realism” at initial publication, and stirring naval action in the cold southern ocean in the chase of the Dutch ship, 20 years after initial publication at the re-issue.

Plot summary

Jack Aubrey, having recovered financially in The Mauritius Command, expands his house, pays off his mother-in-law's debts, and his wife is no longer pinching pennies. His household is staffed with seamen, and his daughters and son are thriving. After serving in the Fencibles office for a while, Aubrey starts getting into difficulties both in cards and at business, due to his belief, on land, in the honesty of others. Diana Villiers returns from America, unmarried. Maturin sees her and hopes again to marry her. After the local settlers enter into a feud with Captain Bligh, the governor in New South Wales, Aubrey takes command of the old HMS Leopard for a mission to New South Wales to escape his woes.  In the meantime, Diana and her American friend Louisa Wogan are taken for questioning as spies. Wogan gets sent to New South Wales on the Leopard, while Aubrey is furious at carrying prisoners. Maturin gets assigned to the voyage by Sir Joseph Blaine to watch Wogan, in the hopes of catching her in espionage. Diana, innocent of the espionage charges, flees with Mr Johnson, but is deeply in Maturin's mind, as he pays her bills.

The prisoners kill their superintendent and surgeon during a storm, so their conditions are raised to meet naval standards. They bring gaol fever on board ship, which spreads to the seamen, killing most of the male prisoners and 116 of the ship's crew. Mr Martin, Maturin's assistant, dies, and is replaced by Michael Herapath, who has stowed away in pursuit of Louisa Wogan. Aubrey rates him a midshipman, despite his American citizenship. Aubrey is forced to leave many recovering crew members at Recife, including Tom Pullings. He is replaced with James Grant as first lieutenant, a challenge for Aubrey. While they are in port, HMS Nymph arrives damaged from its encounter with the Waakzaamheid, a 74-gun Dutch ship-of-the-line crossing the equator.

The Leopard encounters the Waakzaamheid before reaching the Cape of Good Hope. The Waakzaamheid chases the Leopard south into the Roaring Forties for five days. The waves and wind increase, and the ships engage. After a long exchange of fire Captain Aubrey is struck by a large splinter and is knocked senseless. With the Waakzaamheid nearly on top of her a shot from the Leopard strikes her foremast, causing it to fall into the sea. Without its driving force the Waakzaamheid yaws onto her beam ends in the trough of a deep wave and is overwhelmed by the next, sinking with all hands.

Now east of the Cape, the Leopard aims for New South Wales, but soon strikes an iceberg, damaging the rudder and causing a severe leak. All hands pump, and the seamen work to fother a sail to stop the leak. Aubrey was wounded in the battle but maintains his authority. Grant, who is more comfortable as captain, disagrees that the Leopard will float, and is given permission to take the Leopard's boats and the men who wish to leave and head for the Cape. Only the Jolly boat is left behind with the ship. The Leopard  drifts east with the wind, still rudderless, pumping all the time. Aubrey, making adroit use of anchors and sails, directs the ship to safe harbour in a bay of Desolation Island. Despite its name, it is full of fresh food in the rainy Antarctic summer.

The crew repair the damage to the ships hull, but cannot fashion a mounting for a replacement rudder without the use of a forge. The ship's forge had been cast overboard earlier to lighten the ship. Maturin is in paradise as he and Herapath collect samples of the local plant and animal life and identify edible cabbage, which fights scurvy. Maturin uses a small island in the bay for observations in the daylight. After a few days a whaler arrives in the bay. It is the American brig Lafayette, returning to the bay to re-supply with cabbages. They lost their surgeon, but they have a forge. A delicate situation arises immediately, reflecting American – British tensions from the Chesapeake-Leopard Affair of 1807, continued British pressing of Americans into the Royal Navy, and awareness that the two nations might already be at war. Maturin uses Herapath as first envoy to Captain Putnam. Maturin follows, providing medical care to all aboard. The Captain offers to pay, but Maturin does not accept payment. The next morning the forge is on the beach for the use of Aubrey. Maturin sees a perfect way to speed his plan to use Mrs. Wogan to undermine Napoleon's intelligence services by letting her and Herapath slip away on the whaler with falsified information he had intentionally left available for Herapath to copy. She is now pregnant with Herapath's child. Maturin advises Aubrey to resist any efforts at pressing the British sailors they see on the whaler. The rudder is set in place and the forge returned. The Lafayette sails on the tide, as Maturin and Barret Bonden watch the ship pick up Herapath and Mrs Wogan, and then it slips out of the bay.

Characters
See also Recurring characters in the Aubrey–Maturin series

Jack Aubrey - Captain of HMS Leopard and recently painted wearing the Order of the Bath but he does not appear to have been awarded the knighthood as he does not use the title in this or subsequent books.
Stephen Maturin - ship's surgeon, physician, friend to Jack and an intelligence officer. 
Sophia Williams - Jack's wife, mother of their three children, Charlotte, Fanny and young George.
Mrs Williams - Jack Aubrey's mother in law, now financially secure, with tenants in Mapes Court, choosing to live with her daughter and three grandchildren.
Diana Villiers - first cousin to Sophia and the love of Stephen Maturin; recently returned from America.
Sir Joseph Blaine - a senior figure in the Admiralty's espionage department, Maturin's colleague and a fellow naturalist.
Mr Kimber - the schemer (projector) with a process to recover the lead and silver from “valuable dross” on Aubrey's land

At Craddock's for cards
Andrew Wray - in the Patronage Office and the Treasury, involved with intelligence.
Judge Wray - older cousin of Andrew Wray
Mr Carroll – another player, friend of the Wrays
Mr Jenyns – another player, friend of the Wrays
Heneage Dundas – half-pay captain, long time friend of Aubrey, stands up with him at challenge

At Ashgrove Cottage dinner
Lieutenant Tom Pullings – Long time friend of Aubrey and Maturin, to be First Lieutenant on Leopard
Captain Peter Heywood – as young man was in the crew of the Bounty under Lieutenant Bligh, then brought back to England by the cruel Captain Edwards on Pandora, spared from hanging due to his youth. Sailed the Leopard a few years back.

On the Leopard
Mr Martin - assistant to Maturin, chosen by him, specialist in anatomy; mainly recovers from gaol fever after treating so many on ship and documenting his own case, then dies from pneumonia.
Mrs Louisa Wogan - American prisoner on board HMS Leopard sentenced to transportation to New South Wales for spying.
Michael Herapath - an American stowaway and lover of Louisa Wogan. Aubrey saved his life when Herapath fell into the sea while trying to reach the royal masts, for which he is most grateful. He becomes Maturin's surgical assistant after the epidemic.
Mrs Boswell - prisoner on board HMS Leopard, pregnant, her child Leopardina delivered by surgery during the sea battle; also told fortunes to the crew to bad effect, requiring Maturin's intervention. 
Barret Bonden - coxswain for Captain Aubrey, who also watches out for Maturin.
James Grant - Second Lieutenant on HMS Leopard, whose book about a voyage in 1800 to New South Wales is read on board by the Captain and Dr Maturin; replaces Pullings when he is left in Recife to recover.
Babbington - third lieutenant aboard the Leopard, with his Newfoundland dog, long time on crews with Aubrey. Acting second lieutenant after Recife.
George Byron, one of the Midshipmen of HMS Leopard, promoted to acting fourth lieutenant after the epidemic.
Moore - Marine Captain on Leopard, good at gunnery, aimed the shot that hit the foremast of the Dutch 74.
John C Howard - Marine Lieutenant of the Leopard who plays the flute so well, killed by Larkin in 41 degrees south latitude.
Larkin - the master of the Leopard, drunk, considers himself a Jonah, leaves with Grant.
Rev Mr Fisher - chaplain on the Leopard, proves of no help in the epidemic, and proves self-centered as the challenges of the voyage continue.
Faster Doudle - one of the prime seamen who traded their lime juice-laced rum for tobacco after the steering oar broke approaching the Crozet Islands, bringing on scurvy, until treated by Maturin.
David Allan - acting bosun after Grant parted from Leopard; he is essential in the task of anchoring in the bay at Desolation Island.

On the American whaler, the brig Lafayette of Nantucket, Massachusetts
Captain Winthrop Putnam - American captain of whaler, ship with a forge aboard.
Mr Reuben Hyde - first mate who left note at cove about the cabbages.

Ships
 British
HMS Leopard - 50 gun
HMS Nymph - 32 gun
Dutch
Waakzaamheid - 74 gun
American
Lafayette - Whaling brig

Reception
Kirkus Reviews noted the "usual action" present in Desolation Island compared to other nautical novels, and praised O'Brien's "literate, clear-eyed realism", which may broaden the audience for the novel beyond the usual readers of a story on sailing ships. Reviewing a later book in the series for the Los Angeles Times, Anthony Day glowingly recalls Desolation Island, writing, "Aubrey's relentless pursuit of the Dutch warship Waakzaamheid in the roaring ocean below the southern tip of Africa, day after day in frightful weather, stirs the emotions of dread and hope in every reader."

Allusions/references to history, culture and geography 

The Leopard stopped for water and fresh supplies in Saint Jago, one of the Cape Verde islands, west of Senegal and in Aubrey's time a colony of Portugal. In the nineteenth century, Saint Jago was the name rather than the modern Santiago.

The real-life Leopard'''s earlier involvement in the Chesapeake-Leopard Affair is described in the novel. The appearance of the American whaler reveals the tension between the English and the Americans on the eve of the War of 1812. O'Brian based the account of the near sinking of the Leopard (after striking an iceberg) on an actual event involving  and her commander Edward Riou in 1789.

The novel uses Lieutenant James Grant as the model for fictional second lieutenant Grant, who parts from the Leopard when the situation is most grim. The real Grant was promoted to commander in 1805, and this story takes place about 1811. The career of the real Grant with early success as captain of sloops was not followed up by anything more than the promotion to commander, though he was years older than Jack Aubrey, so he provides a good base for the fictional lieutenant who would much rather be the captain.

Captain William Bligh's Governorship of New South Wales is mentioned as the motive for Aubrey's mission, though Aubrey does not reach New South Wales in this novel, nor meet Captain Bligh in any part of the story. Aubrey does tell Maturin how William Bligh is viewed by the Royal Navy, the point of which is that his story-telling foreshadows how Aubrey handles his crew after the Dutch ship sinks and their ship hits the iceberg, and how Aubrey handles Lt Grant, turning a potential mutiny into an officially allowed parting of the ways. In addition, Aubrey and Maturin speak with Captain Peter Heywood who was involved with the mutiny, with Bligh, and with Captain Edwards, sent to fetch the mutineers back.

The reason why Bligh is in trouble in the moment of the novel is also described. In short, Bligh faced another mutiny, but this time by staff under him as Governor of the colony. Captain Heywood offers the explanation that Bligh seemed not to understand the reactions of others to many things he said, and then to react too harshly, which those around him perceived as harsh criticism and a miserable life. The Rum Rebellion, also known as the Rum Puncheon Rebellion, of 1808 was the only successful armed takeover of government in Australia's recorded history. As Governor of New South Wales, William Bligh was deposed by the New South Wales Corps under the command of Major George Johnston, working closely with John Macarthur, on 26 January 1808. Afterwards, acting governors were sworn in until the arrival from Britain of Major-General Lachlan Macquarie at the beginning of 1810.

From the book Desolation Island is geographically close to the Kerguelen Islands. However, in a later book, The Thirteen Gun Salute, O'Brian writes some dialogue between Richardson and Aubrey that explicitly states that Kerguelen Island is not Desolation Island: Kerguelen is what some people call Desolation Island, is it not, sir? asked Richardson. So they do. But it is not our Desolation Island, which is smaller, farther south and east. Despite the dialogue in The Thirteen Gun Salute, the description of the harbor where the Leopard sought shelter is taken exactly from Captain Cook's description of Christmas Harbor, in the far NW corner of Kerguelen which he mapped  with the assistance of his sailing master, William Bligh, on his last voyage.

One reader and amateur critic argued that the novel reprised an ancient theme in religion and mythology, that of descent and redemption. In this view, Jack and Stephen are disgraced in the Overworld, Jack by ruinous investments, card games and quarrels, Stephen by losing a patient, falling from favor with naval intelligence, and above all, by losing Diana. They journey to the Underworld, below the equator, to the high southern latitudes, experience epic trials, and achieve redemption at Desolation Island. This paper, "Allegory Wrestling, or Desolation Island Decoded", was originally posted on the Gunroom email list, devoted to the Aubrey-Maturin series, and presented at a panel on Patrick O'Brian and the series at a popular culture conference in Boston in 1998.

Relation to other novels in the seriesDesolation Island differs from the prior novels in the series in that the main characters are not back in England or safely on the way at the end of the story. This novel leaves them on Desolation Island at the end of the Antarctic summer having just floated the ship and installed the rudder, far from home and from the original intended destination for the mission, with a part of the crew trying to navigate to the Cape in small boats. The reader does not know if the original mission will be completed or how they will get home to England until the next novel, The Fortune of War or a yet later novel. Like the previous novels, characters are introduced who will appear in later novels. Many of the characters appear in the next novel, The Fortune of War, and some will appear in several novels before their story is told (e.g. Andrew Wray).

Film adaptation
The novel was one of the novels in the series which had themes taken into the film Master and Commander: The Far Side of the World.

Publication history
 1978 Collins Hardback First edition 
 1979, March Stein & Day; Hardcover edition First USA edition 
 1979 Fontana / Collins; Paperback edition  / 978-0-00-615586-7 (UK edition)
 1981 Day Books; 1st Mass-market Paperback  edition
 1991 W. W. Norton & Company Paperback Reprint edition  (USA edition)
 1994 W. W. Norton & Company Hardcover Reprint edition  (USA edition)
 1998, May HarperCollins hardback  / 978-0-00-222145-0 (UK edition)
 2001, January Thorndike Press Hardcover Large-print edition  / 978-0-7862-1926-1 (USA edition)
 2001, January Chivers Large Print hardback  / 978-0-7540-1544-4 (UK edition)
 2004 Blackstone Audiobooks Unabridged Audio CD edition  
 1993 Recorded Books Audio CD edition, narrator Patrick Tull,  / 978-1-4025-3930-5 (USA edition)
 2011 W. W. Norton & Company e-Book  (USA edition)
 2011 Harper e-book (UK edition)

This novel was first published by Stein & Day in the USA. Fontana / Collins issued a paperback in the same year, 1979. W W Norton issued a reprint 12 years after the initial publication as part of its reissue in paperback of all the novels in the series prior to 1991.

The process of reissuing the novels initially published prior to 1991 was in full swing in 1991, as the whole series gained a new and wider audience, as Mark Howowitz describes in writing about The Nutmeg of Consolation'', the fourteenth novel in the series and initially published in 1991.

Two of my favorite friends are fictitious characters; they live in more than a dozen volumes always near at hand. Their names are Jack Aubrey and Stephen Maturin, and their creator is a 77-year-old novelist named Patrick O'Brian, whose 14 books about them have been continuously in print in England since the first, "Master and Commander," was published in 1970.

O'Brian's British fans include T. J. Binyon, Iris Murdoch, A. S. Byatt, Timothy Mo and the late Mary Renault, but, until recently, this splendid saga of two serving officers in the British Royal Navy during the Napoleonic Wars was unavailable in this country, apart from the first few installments which went immediately out of print. Last year, however, W. W. Norton decided to reissue the series in its entirety, and so far nine of the 14 have appeared here, including the most recent chapter, The Nutmeg of Consolation.

References

External links
 Maps for Desolation Island
 

1978 British novels
Aubrey–Maturin series
Novels set on islands
William Collins, Sons books